Sri Ananthavaliamman is a temple located at Kuttam in the Tirunelveli district in the South Indian state of Tamil Nadu.

There is a large tamarind tree in front of the temple which is nearly 300 years old. This tamarind tree has many names including Thoonga Puli, Sanjeevi tree. People from Kuttam and nearby villages use this leaf as a medicine.

References

http://wikimapia.org/1776590/Sri-Ananthavalli-Amman-Devasthanam-KUTTAM

Hindu temples in Tirunelveli district